South Teton is the fifth-highest peak in the Teton Range, Grand Teton National Park, in the U.S. state of Wyoming. The peak is south of Middle Teton and just west of Cloudveil Dome and is part of the Cathedral Group of high Teton peaks. The  Teton Range is the youngest mountain chain in the Rocky Mountains, and began their uplift 9 million years ago, during the Miocene. Several periods of glaciation have carved South Teton and the other peaks of the range into their current shapes.

Climbing
South Teton was first climbed on August 29, 1923, by Albert R. Ellingwood and Eleanor Davis.  Ellingwood made the first ascent of Middle Teton the same day. Davis was the first woman to ascend Grand Teton.

From there a trail leads southwest towards a pass between South and Middle Teton. Most ascents of the summit are made from this pass. A number of more difficult ascents are also done by experienced climbers, with difficulty of up to Class 5.11.

See also
Geology of the Grand Teton area
Breast-shaped hill

References

Mountains of Grand Teton National Park
Mountains of Wyoming
Mountains of Teton County, Wyoming